Charles Anandraj (born 26 September 1991) is an Indian professional footballer who plays as a midfielder for FC BENGALURU UNITED in the I-League2nd Division.

Career 
Married to Leena Priyanka R, He made his professional debut for the Chennai City F.C. against Indian Arrows on 29 November 2017, He started and played full match as Chennai City lost 3–0.

Career statistics

References

1991 births
Living people
People from Vellore
Indian footballers
Chennai City FC players  
Footballers from Tamil Nadu
I-League players
Association football midfielders
Gokulam Kerala FC players